Hereford Square is a garden square in South Kensington, London SW7. It lies to the west of Gloucester Road, which forms the east side of the square. Wetherby Place is the western continuation, running off the north-west corner of the square.

10–23 and 27–35 Hereford Square have been listed Grade II on the National Heritage List for England since November 1984.

The garden was used as a baseball field during World War II by American soldiers.

History
Hereford Square was built by the architect Thomas Holmes from 1845 to 1850.

Notable buildings and residents
George Crichton Wells (1914–1999), dermatologist 
George Borrow (1803–1881), lived at No. 22.
Frederick William Hulme (1816–1884), landscape painter and illustrator, lived at No. 4, according to the 1851 census.
John Arrowsmith, cartographer, lived at No. 35 from 1861 to 1873.
Robert Nandor Berki, political scientist, lived at No. 7 in the late 1950s.
William Henry Brookfield, clergyman, died at No. 16 in 1874.
H. O. Arnold-Forster, writer and politician, died at No. 27 in 1909.

The artist Walter Sickert and his wife Ellen stayed at No. 10 Hereford Square in the autumn of 1890 with Ellen's sister, Jane Cobden. The model and writer Tara Moss recalled living in a "freezing granny flat" of a mansion in Hereford Square while she worked as a babysitter during the early days of her modelling career in her 2014 memoir The Fictional Woman.

The writer and social activist Frances Power Cobbe lived with her partner, the sculptor Mary Lloyd, at No. 26 from 1862 to 1884.

Fictional references
The central character in Iris Murdoch's A Severed Head lives in Hereford Square.

References

External links 

1845 establishments in England
Communal gardens
Grade II listed buildings in the Royal Borough of Kensington and Chelsea
Grade II listed houses in London
Houses completed in the 19th century
Hereford Square
Streets in the Royal Borough of Kensington and Chelsea